Harry Madsen Knudsen (4 March 1919 – 1 September 1998) was a Danish rower who competed in the 1948 Summer Olympics.

He was born in Højelse, Køge Municipality. In 1948 he was a crew member of the Danish boat which won the bronze medal in the coxed four event.

References

1919 births
1998 deaths
Danish male rowers
Olympic rowers of Denmark
Rowers at the 1948 Summer Olympics
Olympic bronze medalists for Denmark
Olympic medalists in rowing
Medalists at the 1948 Summer Olympics
People from Køge Municipality
Sportspeople from Region Zealand